Birdless Summer is an autobiography by Han Suyin. It covers the years 1938 to 1948, her work as a midwife in Chengtu and then going to London with her husband, who was a military attaché there. Also her training as a doctor, the start of the last phase of the Chinese Civil War, in which her husband died fighting for the Kuomintang.

She gives a vivid picture of the final years of Kuomintang rule in mainland China, and of reactions to the Japanese invasion. She also tells how she came to write her first book, Destination Chungking. This was actually a joint work, written from her notes but revised by an established writer.

1968 non-fiction books
Autobiographies
Books about China
Books by Han Suyin
Jonathan Cape books